Christopher John Gardner (born March 30, 1969) is a former Major League Baseball pitcher who played for the Houston Astros in 1991. He wore #39.

External links

1969 births
Living people
Cuesta Cougars baseball players
Houston Astros players
Major League Baseball pitchers
Baseball players from Long Beach, California
Gulf Coast Astros players
Asheville Tourists players
Jackson Generals (Texas League) players
Tucson Toros players